The following is a list of the largest attendances in the history of the American professional wrestling promotion WWE.

The list is dominated by WWE's flagship WrestleMania pay-per-view (PPV) event, which since 2007's WrestleMania 23 has been held exclusively in stadiums that typically have a seating capacity of at least 70,000 people or more. Only ten of the attendances listed are non-WrestleMania events, with The Big Event and Global Warning Tour: Melbourne being the only house show events on the list (although both events are listed on WWE Network as pay-per-view events on their pay-per-view list). All but eleven of the events included have been held in the United States where WWE is based, while three have been held in Canada, three in Japan, three in Saudi Arabia, two in Australia, and one in the United Kingdom.

Events and attendances
Note: Minimum attendance of 40,000.Although many of WWE's attendance records are disputed, for the purpose of this list, WWE's announced attendance figures are shown.

Historical

See also
List of professional wrestling attendance records
List of WWE pay-per-view and WWE Network events

References
Notes

Specific

Attendance records
Attendance records
Attendance records
Attendance records
Professional wrestling attendances